John Court (c. 1544 – 7 January 1599) was an English politician.

He was a Member (MP) of the Parliament of England for Bridgwater in 1586 and for Bath in 1589.

References

1544 births
1599 deaths
English MPs 1586–1587
English MPs 1589